Louis B. Kahn (9 May 1918 – 5 July 2012) was an American computer scientist and statistician.

Kahn was born in Chicago, Illinois to Hungarian and Latvian parents. In 1959, he was one of 10 leading pioneers in the application of statistics using electronic computers, and he presented the Queen of the United Kingdom with a statistical paper that he read to the Royal Statistical Society. He fought in World War II in the 9th Infantry Division in Germany as 1st Lieutenant and was honored the Purple Heart, 2 Bronze Medals and 3 Battle Stars. Prof. Kahn's Ph.D thesis was published as a book entitled A Study of Productivity and Its Measurement in 1951. Prof. Kahn co-authored a book entitled Logistics Papers with J.E. Hamilton in 1956. He also authored a paper entitled "A Statistical Model for Evaluating the Reliability of Safety Systems for Plants Manufacturing Hazardous Products" in 1959.

In 1961, the Shell Development Company in Emeryville, California appointed Louis B. Kahn the editor of a new journal, The Logistics Review and Military Logistics Journal. The publication was the official journal of the Military Logistics Society. In January 1962, shortly after becoming Associate Professor of Operations Research at the U.S. Naval Postgraduate School in Monterey, California, he suffered a debilitating cerebral hemorrhage, which severely & permanently impeded his speech & overall mobility. His doctors initially predicted that he would only live 10 days. Yet later in 1962, Professor Kahn was able to start his own company in Berkeley, California called Technical Economics, Inc. As president of the company, Dr. Kahn was the computer application specialist, developing proprietary computer programs. As president, he was also a consulting statistician at the Neurosurgery Department of the University of California Medical Center, San Francisco, California. He was the principal editor of The Logistics Review and Military Logistics Journal as well as the principal editor of The Journal of Biomedical Systems. He also was the founder and assistant editor of The Logistics and Transportation Review. In addition, he was on the editorial advisory board of the publication entitled Current Contents, Life Sciences.

Education
Kahn received a Bachelor of Science degree in Applied Science and Economics from the Illinois Institute of Technology in 1940. After receiving a Certificate of Metallurgy from the University of Manchester School of Technology in 1945, he received a Master of Science degree in Statistics, Economics and Mathematics, and a Ph.D in Statistics from the University of Wisconsin in 1948 and 1951, respectively.

References

Who'sWho in the West, 15th edition, 1976-1977. Chicago, IL: Marquis Who'sWho, 1977

American Men and Women of Science, 13TH EDITION, VOLUME 3 H–K, 
1976

Stock system minimizes risks by George Rhodes, S.F. Examiner & Chronicle, January 20, 1974.

Death

Prof. Kahn died on July 5, 2012 at Chaparral Skilled Nursing in Berkeley, California from complications due to old age.

An obituary published on April 27, 2013 in the Oakland Tribune is viewable here.

External links
 Photo of Louis B. Kahn
 President of Technical Economics, Inc.

Engineers from Illinois
Scientists from Chicago
1918 births
2012 deaths